Joe Martin Richardson (? - 2015) was an emeritus professor of history and author. He was a history professor at Florida State University from 1964 until 2006.

He grew up in Stella, Missouri. He graduated from Southwest Missouri State University in 1958. He earned his master's and doctorate degrees from Florida State University. He was an assistant professor at the University of Mississippi. He became friends with James Meredith, an African American student who enrolled there.

He was married to Patricia Richardson. His daughter Leslie Richardson directs the Center for the Advancement of Teaching at Florida International University. His son Andrew Richardson became a chef.

Books
A History of Fisk University, 1865-1946 (1980)
The Negro in the Reconstruction of Florida, 1865-1877 Florida State University (1965)
Talladega College, The First Century, co-authored with Maxine Jones
The Trial and Imprisonment of Jonathan Walker (1974)
African Americans in the Reconstruction of Florida, 1865-1877 University of Alabama Press (2008)
Christian Reconstruction: The American Missionary Association and Southern Blacks, 1861-1890 University of Alabama Press (2009)
Education for Liberation: The American Missionary Association and African Americans from 1890 to the Civil Rights Movement (2009), co-authored with Maxine Jones

Articles
"Florida Black Codes"
"Florida's Freedmen's Bureau during Reconstruction, 1865-1872" April 8, 2015

See also
Canter Brown Jr., historian of similar subjects in Florida
Larry E. Rivers, historian of similar subjects in Florida

References

Year of birth missing
2015 deaths
Florida State University alumni
Florida State University faculty
University of Mississippi faculty
20th-century American historians
21st-century American historians
Missouri State University alumni